Gumbaynggiric is a pair of related Australian Aboriginal languages, Kumbainggar and Yaygir.

Footnotes

References
Dixon, R. M. W. (2002). Australian Languages: Their Nature and Development. Cambridge University Press.

 
Indigenous Australian languages in New South Wales